DRYOS is a real-time operating system made by Canon and is used in their latest digital cameras and camcorders.

Since late 2007 DIGIC-based cameras are shipped using DryOS. It replaces VxWorks from Wind River Systems which has been used before on Digic2 (DIGIC II) and some Digic3 (DIGIC III) cameras. DryOS had existed before and was in use in other Canon hardware, such as digital video cameras and high-end webcams. 

DRYOS has a 16 kilobytes kernel module at its core and is currently compatible with more than 10 CPU types. It provides a simulation-based development environment for debugging. Canon also developed a USB- and middleware-compatible device driver for file systems and network devices like video server.

DRYOS aims to be compatible with µITRON 4.0 and with POSIX.

Cameras with DRYOS 
The following cameras are known to run DRYOS:
 Canon PowerShot SX1 IS
 Canon PowerShot SX10 IS
 Canon PowerShot SX20 IS
 Canon PowerShot SX30 IS
 Canon PowerShot SX40 HS
 Canon PowerShot SX50 HS
 Canon PowerShot SX60 HS
 Canon PowerShot S5 IS
 Canon PowerShot S90
 Canon PowerShot S95
 Canon PowerShot G9
 Canon PowerShot G10
 Canon PowerShot G11
 Canon PowerShot G12
 Canon PowerShot A470
 Canon PowerShot A480
 Canon PowerShot A580
 Canon PowerShot A590 IS
 Canon PowerShot A650 IS
 Canon PowerShot A720 IS
 Canon PowerShot A810
 Canon PowerShot A1100 IS
 Canon PowerShot A2200 IS
 Canon PowerShot A2300 IS
 Canon PowerShot A3000 IS
 Canon PowerShot A3100 IS
 Canon PowerShot SD1100 IS
 Canon PowerShot SX100 IS
 Canon PowerShot SX110 IS
 Canon PowerShot SX120 IS
 Canon PowerShot SX130 IS
 Canon PowerShot SX160 IS
 Canon PowerShot SX200 IS
 Canon PowerShot SX230 IS
 Canon PowerShot SX230 HS
 Canon PowerShot SD780 IS
 Canon PowerShot SD880 IS
 Canon PowerShot SD990 IS (IXUS 980 IS)
 Canon PowerShot SD1400 IS
 Canon Powershot ELPH100 HS (IXUS 115 HS)
 Canon EOS 5D Mark II
 Canon EOS 5D Mark III
 Canon EOS 6D
 Canon EOS 50D
 Canon EOS 100D
 Canon EOS 200D
 Canon EOS 500D
 Canon EOS 550D
 Canon EOS 600D
 Canon EOS 650D
 Canon EOS 700D
 Canon EOS 750D
 Canon EOS 1100D
 Canon EOS 1200D
 Canon EOS 1300D
 Canon EOS 7D
 Canon EOS 7D Mark II
 Canon EOS 60D
 Canon EOS M
 Canon EOS M2
 Canon EOS M3
 Canon EOS M10
 Canon EOS M50
 Canon EOS M100

References

External links 
 Canon DRYOS technology explanation page
 Canon technology explanation page covering many Canon technologies, including DRYOS

Real-time operating systems
Camera firmware